2014 Finland-Sweden Athletics International is the 74th edition of Finland-Sweden Athletics International competition between Sweden and Finland. It was held 30–31 August 2014 in the Helsinki Olympic Stadium in Helsinki, Finland. The women's pole vault was exceptionally competed on 29 August at the Narinkkatori square in downtown Helsinki. Sweden won both the men's and women's events, while Finland won the smaller boy's, girl's and walking events.

Results 
Points given in each event are, from 1st to 6th place: 7-5-4-3-2-1, in relays 1st and 2nd place are awarded with 5 and 2 points.

Points:

Men 
Finland's points are shown first

Women 
Finland's points are shown first

References

External links 
Finland-Sweden Athletics International Official Homepage (in Finnish and Swedish)

Finland-Sweden Athletics International
International athletics competitions hosted by Finland
Finland-Sweden Athletics International
Finland-Sweden Athletics International
International athletics competitions hosted by Sweden
International sports competitions in Helsinki
2010s in Helsinki
Finland-Sweden Athletics International